Embodied music cognition is a direction within systematic musicology interested in studying the role of the human body in relation to all musical activities.

It considers the human body as the natural mediator between mind (focused on musical intentions, meanings, significations) and physical environment (containing musical sound and other types of energy that affords human action).

Introduction 
Given the impact of body movement on musical meaning formation and signification, the musical mind is said to be embodied. Embodiment  assumes that what happens in the mind is depending on properties of the body, such as kinaesthetic properties.

Embodied music cognition tends to see music perception as based on action. For example, many people move when they listen to music. Through movement, it is assumed that people give meaning to music. This type of meaning-formation is corporeal, rather than cerebral because it is understood through the body. This is different from a disembodied approach to music cognition, which sees musical meaning as being based on a perception-based analysis of musical structure. The embodied grounding of music perception is based on a multi-modal encoding of auditory information and on principles that ensure the coupling of perception and action.

During the last decade, research in embodied music cognition 
has been strongly motivated by a demand for new tools in view of the interactive possibilities offered by digital media technology.

With the advent of powerful computing tools, and in particular real-time interactive music systems, gradually more attention has been devoted to the role of gesture in music. This musical gestures research has been rather influential in that it puts more emphasis on
sensorimotor feedback and integration, as well as on the coupling
of perception and action. With new sensor technology, gesture-based research has meanwhile become a vast domain of music research, with consequences for the methodological and epistemological foundations of music cognition research.

Method
The scientific apparatus draws upon an empirical and evidence-based methodology, which is based on measurement of sound (via audio-recording), human movement (via video-recording, kinematic recording), human biology (via bioparameter-recording) and semantics (via questionnaires). Using a scientific apparatus for measurement, statistical analysis and computational modelling, embodied music cognition aims to build up reliable knowledge about the role of the human body in meaning formation.

Applications
Research in embodied music cognition has a strong connection with technology development, more particularly, in fields related to interactive music systems, and music information retrieval. Mediation technology is the technology by which the human body, and consequently also the human mind, can be given an extension in the digital musical domain.

How it is distinct from (disembodied) music cognition
Cartesian dualism had a tremendous impact on cognitive science and in particular on cognitive musicology. Influenced by Gestalt psychology, music cognition research of the last decades of the 20th Century was mainly focusing on the perception of structure, that is, the perception of pitch, melody, rhythm, harmony and tonality. It considered music perception as a faculty on its own, completely dissociated from musical action. Instead, in studies on embodied musical activity (such as listening and music performance), subjects are invited to actively engage in the signification process. This engagement is articulated by means of corporeal expression which can be measured, analyzed, modelled and related to the musical stimulus. René Descartes' idea that mental activity is of a separate order from body movement is refuted and, in fact reversed.

How it is distinct from traditional musicology
The difference with the traditional phenomenological and hermeneutic approaches to musical meaning formation is that embodied music cognition has a focus on an empirical and evidence-based methodology, rather than on subjective first-person descriptions. Embodied music cognition aims at giving a full account of the subjective involvement by taking into account the role of the social-cultural context, subjective background (involving gender, age, familiarity with music, degree of music education).

Embodied music cognition adopts a scientific methodology but its aim is not to reduce music to physics, nor to reduce gesture and embodied meaning to the biomechanics of the human body. Instead, embodied music cognition fully recognizes the contribution of all mental and bodily systems including subjective feelings, emotions and coinaesthetic (or body image) awareness.

See also 
 Embodied cognition
 Music psychology
 Musical gesture
 Music philosophy
 Music therapy

Further reading
Godøy, Rolf, y Marc Leman, eds. (2010). Musical gestures : sound, movement, and meaning, New York: Routledge.

Leman, Marc (2007). Embodied Music Cognition and Mediation Technology, Cambridge, Massachusetts: MIT Press.

López Cano, Rubén (2003). “Setting the body in music. Gesture, Schemata and Stylistic-Cognitive Types”. International Conference on Music and Gesture University of East Anglia 28–31 August 2003. (available on line)

López Cano, Rubén (2006). “What kind of affordances are musical affordances? A semiotic approach”. Paper presented at L’ascolto musicale: condotte, pratiche, grammatiche. Bologna 23–25 February 2006. (available on line)

López Cano, Rubén (2008). “Che tipo di affordances sono le affordances musicali? Una prospettiva semiotica”. En Daniele Barbieri, Luca Marconi e Francesco Spampinato (eds.). L'ascolto: condotte, pratiche, grammatiche. Lucca: LIM. pp. 43–54.

Matyja, J. R. (2016). Embodied Music Cognition: Trouble Ahead, Trouble Behind. Frontiers in Psychology, 7. https://doi.org/10.3389/fpsyg.2016.01891

Reybrouck, Mark. (2001a). “Biological roots of musical epistemology: Functional Cycles, Umwelt, and enactive listening”. Semiotica, 134 (1-4): 599-633.

Reybrouck, Mark. (2001b). "Musical Imagery between Sensory Processing and Ideomotor Simulation". En Musical Imagery, eds. I. Godøy y H.Jörgensen, 117-136, Lisse: Swets & Zeitlinger.

Reybrouck, Mark. (2005a). “A Biosemiotic and Ecological Approach to Music Cognition: Event Perception between Auditory Listening and Cognitive Economy”. Axiomathes. An International Journal in Ontology and Cognitive Systems, 15 (2): 229-266.

Reybrouck, Mark. (2005b). “Body, mind and music: musical semantics between experiential cognition and cognitive economy”. TRANS 9. (available on line)

Zbikowski, Lawrence M. (2002). Conceptualizing Music: Cognitive Structure, Theory, and Analysis, New York: Oxford University Press.

External links 
 Summer School in Systematic Musicology, focus on embodied music cognition, Ghent University (Belgium)

Musicology
Music cognition
Music psychology